The Hidden Woman is a lost 1922 American silent drama film directed by Allan Dwan and starring Evelyn Nesbit in her final full-length feature film. The film was claimed to be made in 1916 and not released until 1922, but this is impossible since Anne Shirley is a cast member and she was born in 1918. Nesbit's son, Russell Thaw, has a role in the film.

Cast
Evelyn Nesbit as Ann Wesley
Crauford Kent as Bart Andrews
Murdock MacQuarrie as Iron MacLoid
Ruth Darling as Vera MacLoid
Albert Hart as Bill Donovan (credited as Albert Hart)
Russell Thaw as Johnny Randolph
Mary Alden as Mrs. Randolph
Jack Evans as The Derelict
Anne Shirley as Girl (credited as Dawn O'Day)

References

External links

1922 films
American silent feature films
Lost American films
Films directed by Allan Dwan
1922 drama films
American black-and-white films
Silent American drama films
1922 lost films
Lost drama films
1920s American films